EUD may refer to:

 End-user development
 Europa-Union Deutschland, a German Eurofederalism organization
 European Union of the Deaf
 Europeans United for Democracy, a political alliance